Wenallt Hill (often called simply The Wenallt) is located in Cardiff, Wales. The name is Welsh and translates to 'white wooded slope'.

Although Cardiff residents sometimes call it a mountain, it is too low to be classified as a mountain. It is owned by Cardiff County Council and operated as public land, and looks down onto the village of Rhiwbina in the northern suburbs of Cardiff.

A large telecommunications tower is located at the top of the hill, near to which is a heavily vandalised former military bunker.

Wenallt Camp is the remains of an Iron Age enclosure on the southern slopes of the hill.

Together with the Garth Mountain a mile or so to the west, Wenallt Hill can be seen from most of Cardiff city centre.

The south facing slope of the hill overlooking Cardiff is now covered in trees, whereas in the early-1970s it was covered in ferns and bracken with a network of paths crisscrossing the slope. Bluebells are abundant in May.

External links 
Photos of Wenallt Hill and surrounding area on geograph.org.uk

Mountains and hills of Cardiff